Love Love Love is a 2017 Nepalese romance drama comedy social thriller film, directed and written by Dipendra K Khanal, and produced by Sharmila Pandey, under the banner of Suraj Cine Arts Pvt. Ltd with HighlightsNepal and Aslesha Entertainment. The film stars Suraj Pandey and Swastima Khadka in the lead roles, alongside Ramesh Budathoki, Rupa Rana and  A. Gurung. The film is about a man who falls in love with a girl who does not love him in return. The film was shot in Pokhara, Manakamana, Panchase and Gosaikunda.

Plot 
The main character, Suraj (Suraj Pandey), falls in love with his childhood friend, Samriddhi (Swastima Khadka), but soon realizes that she does not return his feelings. One day, he takes Samriddhi on a tour in hopes of winning over her affection.

Cast and Crew

Cast 
 Suraj Pandey as Suraj 
 Swastima Khadka as Samriddhi
 Ramesh Budathoki
 Rupa Rana
 A. Gurung

Crew 
 Dipendra K Khanal - Director
 Uttam Neupane - Sound Engineer
 Sahailesh Shrestha - Background Score

Production

Budget 
The film's budget was set about 50 million Nepalese rupees and the film was listed in highest  Nepalese films budget and it was in no.3.

Soundtrack

References

External links 
 

Nepalese romantic comedy films
Films directed by Dipendra K Khanal
Films shot in Pokhara